Tua may refer to:

 Tua River, a river in Portugal
 Tua (Papua New Guinea), a river in Papua New Guinea
 Tuʻa, also known as Alo, a chiefdom in Wallis and Futuna in Oceania
 Tua line, a railway line in Portugal
 Tua railway station, in Portugal
 David Tua (born 1972), Samoan-New Zealand boxer
 Tua Forsström (born 1947), Finnish Swedish-language writer
 Tua Tagovailoa (born 1998), American football quarterback
 "Tua", the Māori language version of the song Bigger by Stan Walker

See also
 Toua, a given name and surname
 Tuatua, a species of edible clam
 TUA (disambiguation)
 Twa, hunting castes in Africa
 Tuva (disambiguation)